Mitsubishi Type 92 may refer to:

 Mitsubishi Type 92 Reconnaissance Aircraft, Mitsubishi 2MR8, or the radial engine powering the aircraft
 Mitsubishi Type 92 Heavy Bomber, or Mitsubishi Ki-20